Meadowbrook is an unincorporated community in New Castle County, Delaware, United States. Meadowbrook is located along North Star Road north of Delaware Route 72, north of Pike Creek Valley and south of North Star.

References 

Unincorporated communities in New Castle County, Delaware
Unincorporated communities in Delaware